Roncello is a comune (municipality) in the Province of Monza and Brianza in the Italian region Lombardy, located about  northeast of Milan.

Roncello borders the following municipalities: Bellusco, Busnago, Ornago, Trezzano Rosa, Basiano.

Notable people
 Paolo Pulici - 1950, soccer player.

Twin towns
 Nowy Duninów, Poland

References

External links
 Official website

Cities and towns in Lombardy